Budzisław may refer to the following places:
Budzisław, Radziejów County in Kuyavian-Pomeranian Voivodeship (north-central Poland)
Budzisław, Żnin County in Kuyavian-Pomeranian Voivodeship (north-central Poland)
Budzisław, Świętokrzyskie Voivodeship (south-central Poland)